Lyonia mariana, the Piedmont staggerbush and staggerbush, is a perennial shrub that is native to the United States.

Conservation status
It is listed as endangered in Pennsylvania, historical in Rhode Island, and as a species of special concern and believed extirpated in Connecticut.

Ethnobotany

The Cherokee use an infusion of the plant for toe itch, 'ground-itch' and ulcers.

References

mariana
Plants used in traditional Native American medicine